The Puerto Rican crow (Corvus pumilis) is an extinct crow species in the family Corvidae that was endemic to Puerto Rico and the United States Virgin Islands. Little is known about its habitat, but it possibly died out after the colonization of humans on these islands.

Description 
 
The holotype specimen is a subfossil ulna.

Habitat 
Residues of the crow were found on Puerto Rico, and on the island St. Croix, which belongs to the United States Virgin Islands.

Little is known about its habitat. As it existed together with C. leucognaphalus on Puerto Rico, it possibly occupied a different ecological niche as the latter, and was perhaps rather common in the island's lowlands.

Classification and taxonomy 
The earliest residues of the crow were found in 1916, in the karst cave Cueva San Miguel near Morovis, Puerto Rico. It was a right ulna (AMNH 4925), which Alexander Wetmore described in 1920 as a holotype for his first description of the species C. pumilis. Wetmore did not comment on the etymology of the epithet pumilis, which means "dwarfish" in Latin. There are no insights on its relationships with other species of its genus within and beyond the Caribbean.

Extinction 
C. pumilis possibly became extinct before the colonization of the islands. In Puerto Rico, it is only known from lagerstätten; on St. Croix, it was found on a hearth from the Pre-Columbian era.

References 

Further reading
  Pierce Brodkorb: Catalogue of Fossil Birds. In: Bulletin of the Florida State Museum. Biological sciences. 23 (3), 1978. pages 139–157. (full text)
  Julian Pender Hume, Michael Walters: Extinct Birds. A & C Black, London 2012. .
  Alexander Wetmore: Five New Species of Birds from Cave Deposits in Porto Rico. In: Proceedings of the Biological Society of Washington 33, 1920. pages 77–81. (full text)
  Alexander Wetmore: Bird Remains from Cave Deposits on Great Exuma Island in the Bahamas. In: Bulletin of the Museum of Comparative Zoölogy at Harvard College 80, 1937. pages 427–441.

Corvus
Extinct birds of the Caribbean
Holocene extinctions
Taxa named by Alexander Wetmore